The 1996 NCAA Division II men's basketball tournament was the 40th annual single-elimination tournament to determine the national champion of men's NCAA Division II college basketball in the United States.

The tournament, which featured forty-eight teams, culminated the 1995–96 NCAA Division II men's basketball season.

The Elite Eight, national semifinals, and championship were played at the Commonwealth Convention Center in Louisville, Kentucky.

Fort Hays State (34–0) defeated Northern Kentucky in the final, 70–63, to win their first Division II national title.

Regionals

East - California, Pennsylvania 
Location: Hamer Hall Host: California University of Pennsylvania

South - Normal, Alabama 
Location: Elmore Coliseum Host: Alabama A&M University

North Central - Hays, Kansas 
Location: Gross Memorial Coliseum Host: Fort Hays State University

South Central - Rolla, Missouri 
Location: Gale Bullman Multi-Purpose Building Host: University of Missouri at Rolla

Northeast - Goffstown, New Hampshire 
Location: Stoutenburgh Gymnasium Host: Saint Anselm College

South Atlantic - Richmond, Virginia 
Location: Arthur Ashe Athletic Center Host: Virginia Union University

Great Lakes - Evansville, Indiana 
Location: Physical Activities Center Host: University of Southern Indiana

West - Bakersfield, California 
Location: CSUB Student Activities Center Host: California State University, Bakersfield

Elite Eight-Louisville, Kentucky
Location:  Commonwealth Convention Center Host: Bellarmine College

All-tournament team
 Sherick Simpson, Fort Hays State
 Paul Cluxton, Northern Kentucky
 LaRon Moore, Northern Kentucky
 Alonzo Goldston, Fort Hays State
 Kebu Stewart, Cal State Bakersfield

See also
1996 NCAA Division II women's basketball tournament
1996 NCAA Division I men's basketball tournament
1996 NCAA Division III men's basketball tournament
1996 NAIA Division I men's basketball tournament
1996 NAIA Division II men's basketball tournament

References
 1996 NCAA Division II men's basketball tournament jonfmorse.com

NCAA Division II men's basketball tournament
Tournament
NCAA Division II basketball tournament
NCAA Division II basketball tournament